Decora may refer to:

 Decora, Georgia, a community in the United States
 Decora (rapper), an American hip hop artist
 a line of electrical and electronic products offered by Leviton
 Fruits (magazine), Japanese fashion magazine
 Decora (style), a Japanese street fashion seen in Harajuku, first documented by Fruits (magazine)